The second season of Junior Bake Off Brasil premiered on February 16, 2019 at 10:30 p.m. on SBT.

This season marks the debut of Nadja Haddad as the main host and Olivier Anquier as a judge, replacing Carol Fiorentino and Fabrizio Fasano Jr., who both  left the show over contract disputes following production of the first season.

Bakers
The following is a list of contestants:

Results summary

Key
  Advanced
  Judges' favourite bakers
  Star Baker
  Eliminated
  Judges' bottom bakers
  Returned
  Runner-up
  Winner

Technical challenges ranking

Key
  Star Baker
  Eliminated

Ratings and reception

Brazilian ratings
All numbers are in points and provided by Kantar Ibope Media.

References

External links 

 Junior Bake Off Brasil on SBT

2019 Brazilian television seasons